The Lillie Parsons was an American two-masted schooner which sank in the Saint Lawrence Seaway near Brockville, Ontario, Canada, in 1877.

The ship was launched on September 14, 1868, in Tonawanda, New York. On August 5, 1877, she hit a rock, took on water and sank after her cargo shifted during a squall.

The wreck was discovered on August 6, 1963, by three members of the local diving club, complete with 500 tons of coal on board.

References

External links
Lillie Parsons diving information from Geodiving
Lillie Parsons dive guide from Save Ontario Shipwrecks

1868 ships
Ships built in New York (state)
Shipwrecks of the Saint Lawrence River
Maritime incidents in August 1877